Majengo is a slum in Nairobi Kenya. It is approximately 3km from Nairobi CBD and next Gikomba Market. Majengo makes part of Pumwani ward; which is in the larger Kamukunji sub-county, one of the sub-counties of Nairobi City County. Majengo also host the headquarters for Kamukunji Constituency.

Majengo has 5 villages : Mashimoni, Sofia, Bash/Highrise, Kitui village, Digo and Katanga. 
The major roads cutting through the settlement are, Digo Road, Lumbwa street, Meru Road, Lamu Road and Munyema street. 
It existed in the 1920s already.
Majengo clinic exists in Majengo.

References

Suburbs of Nairobi
Slums in Kenya